Simon Schwendener (10 February 1829 – 27 May 1919) was a Swiss botanist who was a native of Buchs in the Canton of St. Gallen. 

In 1856 he received his doctorate at the University of Zurich, where afterwards he was an assistant to Carl Wilhelm von Nägeli (1817–1891). In 1860 he became a professor of botany at
the University of Munich, and in 1867 a professor of botany and director of the Botanical Gardens in Basel. In 1877 he succeeded Wilhelm Hofmeister (1824–1877) as professor of botany at the University of Tübingen, and from 1878 until his retirement in 1910, Schwendener was a professor at the University of Berlin.

Simon Schwendener is remembered for his investigations of plant anatomy and physiology, being interested in the inter-relationship between a plant's construction and its functionality. He took a mechanistic approach to his botanical studies, believing that a plant's anatomical structure conformed to principles of mechanics.  He conducted extensive research on the mechanics of sap ascent, the construction of a leaf's pulvinus, the positioning of a plants' leaves, and the inner-workings between stomata and its guard cells.

In 1867 Schwendener announced to the scientific world his hypothesis that lichen was formed by two separate organisms, a fungus and an alga. At the time his theory was largely rejected, but it was afterwards proven to be factual. During his long career he had several renowned students and assistants, including Carl Correns, Gottlieb Haberlandt, Richard Kolkwitz, Emil Heinricher, Max Westermaier, Georg Volkens and Otto Heinrich Warburg.

Honors 
He was elected on the 1st of May 1884 a Foreign Member of the Linnean Society of London. The plant genus Schwendenera K.Schum. in the family Rubiaceae is named in his honor.

Selected writings 
 Das mechanische Princip im anatomischen Bau der Monocotylen (1874) – The mechanistic principle on the anatomical structure of monocots.
 Mechanische Theorie der Blattstellungen (1878) – The mechanistic theory of leaf positioning.
 Über Bau und Mechanik der Spaltöffnungen (1881) – On the structure and mechanics of the stomata.
 Gesammelte Botanische Mittheilungen (1898) – Collected botanical treatises.

References 
 German Botanical Society Life and Work of Simon Schwendener
 List of publications copied from an article on Simon Schwendener at the French Wikipedia.

1829 births
1919 deaths
19th-century Swiss botanists
People from the canton of St. Gallen
Academic staff of the University of Basel
Academic staff of the University of Tübingen
Academic staff of the Ludwig Maximilian University of Munich
Academic staff of the Humboldt University of Berlin
Foreign Members of the Royal Society
Recipients of the Pour le Mérite (civil class)
20th-century Swiss botanists
Members of the Göttingen Academy of Sciences and Humanities
Members of the Royal Society of Sciences in Uppsala